Mariana Suman (born 29 July 1951) is a Romanian middle-distance runner. She competed in the women's 800 metres at the 1976 Summer Olympics.

References

1951 births
Living people
Athletes (track and field) at the 1976 Summer Olympics
Romanian female middle-distance runners
Olympic athletes of Romania
Place of birth missing (living people)